Frank Hatton (25 September 1921 – 16 May 1978) was a Labour Party politician in the United Kingdom.

Hatton was a personnel officer for the Central Electricity Generating Board from 1951 to 1973. He unsuccessfully fought Manchester Moss Side in 1970, but was elected as Member of Parliament (MP) for Manchester Exchange at a 1973 by-election.  When the seat was abolished in boundary changes for the February 1974 general election, Hatton was returned to the House of Commons as MP for Moss Side. 

In 1949, Hatton married Olive Kelly, and they had two sons. While in office, he died in Manchester on 16 May 1978, aged 56, following a long illness. His successor in the subsequent by-election was George Morton.

References 

Times Guide to the House of Commons October 1974

External links 
 

1921 births
1978 deaths
Labour Party (UK) MPs for English constituencies
UK MPs 1970–1974
UK MPs 1974
UK MPs 1974–1979